Sagi Karni is the Ambassador of Israel to Singapore.  He was the Ambassador to Angola and non-resident Ambassador to Mozambique and Sao Tome & Principe, beginning in 2008.  He was Consul General to Hong Kong and Macau from 2013-2017.

He graduated with a Bachelor of Science in Biology and Philosophy from the Hebrew University of Jerusalem and a Master’s Degree in Public Policy from the Tel Aviv University.,

References

Ambassadors of Israel to Singapore
Hebrew University of Jerusalem alumni
Tel Aviv University alumni
Ambassadors of Israel to Angola
Israeli consuls
Ambassadors of Israel to Mozambique
Ambassadors of Israel to São Tomé and Príncipe
Year of birth missing (living people)
Living people